The 2001–02 snooker season was a series of snooker tournaments played between 11 August 2001 and 12 May 2002. The following table outlines the results for ranking events and the invitational events.


Calendar

Official rankings 

The top 16 of the world rankings, these players automatically played in the final rounds of the world ranking events and were invited for the Masters.

Notes

References

External links

2001
Season 2002
Season 2001